FASN may refer to 
 the FASN gene that encodes Fatty acid synthase
 Fellowship of the American Society of Nephrology